A Maid in Bedlam is a 1977 album by The John Renbourn Group.

Track listing
All tracks Traditional; except where indicated
 "Black Waterside" – 3:24
 "Nacht Tanz/Shaeffertanz" (Tielman Susato)  – 3:26  
 "A Maid in Bedlam" – 3:57
 "Gypsy Dance/Jews Dance" (Hans Neusidler)  – 3:27
 "John Barleycorn" – 3:40
 "Reynardine" – 3:23
 "My Johnny was a Shoemaker" – 2:46
 "Death and the Lady" – 3:21
 "The Battle of Augrham/5 in a Line" – 5:49
 "Talk About Suffering" – 3:29

Personnel 
The John Renbourn Group
 John Renbourn – guitars, vocals
 Tony Roberts – vocals, flute, recorders, oboe, piccolo flute
 Jacqui McShee – vocals
 Sue Draheim – fiddle, vocals
 Keshav Sathe – tabla, finger cymbals
Technical
Nic Kinsey - engineer

References

1977 albums
John Renbourn albums
Transatlantic Records albums